Prince Harvey is an American rapper, music producer, artist and activist. He is best known for his album PHATASS which he recorded at an Apple Store in New York City.

Early life
Prince Harvey was born in Los Angeles, California. He grew up in the Caribbean, on the island of Dominica. He wrote his first song at the age of eight, inspired by the rapper, Juvenile's song "Back That Azz Up". At age 14, he moved to the Bronx, New York City with his family.

Career
On July 7, 2012, Prince Harvey released "No Music" on Soundcloud. The song is completely a cappella, and re-appropriates a popular New York City clap-and-chant routine. In a recent documentary, Harvey stated that he wanted to showcase the voice as "the most important instrument", and decided to make an entire a cappella album. While recording the album, Harvey ran into an obstacle when a friend offered to transfer an apartment in his name. Within three days of moving in, he received a notice from the landlord that the rent on the apartment was outstanding. The locks were changed, and all his belongings were seized, including his computer with all of his recordings. Unable to afford a new computer, he visited the Apple Store for four months and used their display computers to create his album.

In November 2014, Harvey released "Sometimes" as the first single from PHATASS. In January 2015, he released an accompanying video, shot in the New York City Subway, where he jumps in and out of subway tracks, sails a paper boat, and drops cue cards while walking through the train cars similar to Bob Dylan's Subterranean Homesick Blues video.

On May 27, 2015, he released "The New Black" as the second single from PHATASS (acronym for Prince Harvey At The Apple Store: Soho), and announced that the album would be coming out that July.

At midnight, on July 5, 2015, The Daily Beast published an article titled "He Made a Secret Album in an Apple Store" written by Matthew Narvin. The piece chronicles Harvey's experiences making PHATASS and announces the release date set for later that month. Within hours of publication the article had gone viral, being shared on social media by celebrities like Talib Kweli, Russell Simmons, Lil Wayne and news outlets and magazines like The Guardian and Billboard. Once word had gotten out about PHATASS, numerous publications proclaimed Prince Harvey a genius.

Harvey used this new attention to tour the United States and Europe. In October 2016, he released "Sorry" and announced that he had been working on a new EP titled Golden Child.  On November 8, 2016, the day of the US Presidential Election, Harvey released "Stay Gold" as the first single from Golden Child. He also spoke about the election, indicating that he was not particularly excited about either candidate. "One wants me in jail, the other wants to kick me out of the country", he told Paper magazine. In Spring 2017, he released the EP Golden Child, a collaborative project with producer Holly.

On July 17, 2017, Harvey released "R.I.P. 2016" on Soundcloud, a song that told the story of the death of his step-father and his friend, Dorian, who died of a drug overdose while sleeping in the same bed with Harvey. That same day, he announced that he would be releasing a song a day for the next 100 days as a protest against Trump.

Discography

Studio albums 
 PHATASS (2015)

Extended plays 
 Golden Child (with Holly) (2016)
 SSICC (2019)
 SSICC II: Self Care As Warfare (2021)

Singles

Music videos

External links

References 

Living people
American activists
American male artists
American male rappers
Record producers from California
21st-century American rappers
21st-century American male musicians
Year of birth missing (living people)